HMS Tobago was an  destroyer which served with the Royal Navy during the Greco-Turkish War. Launched by Thornycroft on 15 July 1918, the vessel followed a design typical of the yard by being faster than the majority of the class, and also had better seakeeping properties thanks to a raised forecastle. The destroyer operated as part of the Grand Fleet for the last few weeks of the First World War, and, after the Armistice, joined the Mediterranean Fleet based in Malta.  While serving in off the coast of Turkey, the ship hit a mine on 15 July 1920, exactly two years after being launched. Despite the relative youth of the vessel, the damage was deemed irrepairable and so Tobago returned to Malta and was sold for scrap on 9 February 1922.

Design and development

Tobago was one of two  destroyers ordered by the British Admiralty from Thornycroft in April 1917 as part of the Eleventh War Construction Programme alongside . The design was based on the  destroyer  built by the shipyard. Compared to the standard S-class vessels, the design, also known as Modified Rosalind, was longer, with a raised forward gun position and  torpedo tubes moved to a new position, both of which improved seakeeping. They also had provision for triple mounts for the main torpedo tubes. In a similar way to previous designs, Thornycroft also installed more powerful machinery to give the warship a higher top speed.

Displacement was  normal and  full load. Two funnels were fitted, the forward one larger in diameter.

Tobagos armament consisted of three QF 4in Mk IV guns on the ship's centreline. One was mounted on the raised forecastle, while another was positioned between the second and third funnels and the last was located aft. The ship also mounted a single 2-pounder (40 mm) pom-pom anti-aircraft gun for air defence.  Six  torpedoes were launched from two triple rotating mounts located aft with two  mounts fitted athwartships.  This ship's complement was 90 officers and ratings.

Construction and career
Laid down in May 1917, Tobago was launched on 15 July 1918 and completed on 2 October that year. The destroyer joined the Fourteenth Destroyer Flotilla just before the end of the First World War. After the Armistice, the Grand Fleet was dissolved. Tobago was recommissioned on 22 February 1919 and assigned to the Mediterranean Fleet under . The ship was assigned to Malta to support of British interests in the Greco-Turkish War. The damage was deemed uneconomic to repair and, on 15 December 1920, the ship was paid off. The destroyer returned to Malta and was sold for scrap on 9 February 1922.

Pennant numbers

References

Citations

Bibliography
 
 
 
 
 
 

 

1918 ships
S-class destroyers (1917)
Ships built by John I. Thornycroft & Company
World War I destroyers of the United Kingdom